The water castle of Bourtzi (from Ottoman Turkish برج - burc meaning "tower"; formerly Καστέλι, Kasteli) is a Venetian castle located in the middle of the harbour of Nafplio.

See also
Bourtzi (disambiguation)

References

External links

Buildings and structures completed in 1473
Castles in the Peloponnese
Venetian fortifications in Greece
Nafplion
Tourist attractions in Peloponnese (region)
Water castles
15th-century architecture in Greece